The Qianfu Lun (Qiánfū lún, "Comments of a Recluse"), also known by its Wade-Giles romanization Ch'ien-fu Lun, is a political-metaphysical text by the Later Han philosopher Wang Fu. It contains criticisms of contemporary societies, especially the power of consort clans and the growing regionalism. In the work, Wang Fu strongly supports the Confucian model of good government and humanism.

Further reading
 Anne Behnke Kinney. The Art of the Han Essay: Wang Fu's Ch'ien-Fu Lun. Phoenix: Arizona State University Center for Asian Research, 1990.

References

External links
 Full text of the Qianfu Lun (Chinese) - Chinese Text Project

Chinese classic texts